The Sun of St. Moritz is a 1954 West German drama film directed by Arthur Maria Rabenalt and starring Winnie Markus, Karlheinz Böhm and Signe Hasso.

The film's art direction was by Felix Smetana.

Cast
Winnie Markus as Lore Engelhofer
Karlheinz Böhm as Dr. Robert Frank
Signe Hasso as Gerti Selle
Ingrid Pan as Yvonne Beerli
Claus Biederstaedt as Paul Genzmer
Erik Frey as Dr. Mayr
Heinrich Gretler as Herr Thuregg
Addi Adametz
Gertrud Bald
Arno Ebert
Harry Halm
Harry Hardt
Walter Janssen
Rudolf Reiff

References

External links

1954 drama films
German drama films
West German films
Films directed by Arthur Maria Rabenalt
Remakes of German films
Sound film remakes of silent films
Films set in the Alps
Films set in Switzerland
German black-and-white films
1950s German films
1950s German-language films